Carex joorii, commonly called cypress swamp sedge, is a species of flowering plant in the sedge family (Cyperaceae). It is native to the United States, where it is found primarily in the Southeastern region. Its natural habitat is in the shallow water of depression swamps, often growing with Sphagnum moss. It can also be found in bottomland woods, and in wet prairies.

Carex joorii is a perennial graminoid. It produces fruits in the summer through early fall.

References

joorii
Taxa named by Liberty Hyde Bailey
Flora of the Southeastern United States
Plants described in 1886